Egira is a moth genus in the family Noctuidae. This genus has several species, including Egira crucialis, that are on wing in winter and early spring. They are sometimes, along with members of the Orthosia genus, called early spring millers.

Species
 Egira acronyctoides (Wileman, 1914)
 Egira alternans (Walker, [1857]) (syn: Egira onychina (Guenée, 1852))
 Egira ambigua Galsworthy, 1997
 Egira anatolica (Hering, 1933)
 Egira baueri (Buckett, 1967, [1968])
 Egira cognata (Smith, 1894)
 Egira conspicillaris (Linnaeus, 1758)
 Egira contaminata (Chang, 1991)
 Egira crucialis (Harvey, 1875)
 Egira curialis (Grote, 1873) (syn: Egira candida (Smith, 1894))
 Egira dolosa (Grote, 1880)
 Egira draudti (Hacker, 1993)
 Egira fatima Hreblay, 1994
 Egira februalis (Barnes & McDunnough, 1918)
 Egira hiemalis (Grote, 1874)
 Egira natalensis (Butler, 1875)
 Egira ornata Hreblay & Ronkay, 1999
 Egira papae Hreblay & Ronkay, 1999
 Egira perigraphoides Hreblay & Ronkay, 1999
 Egira perlubens (Grote, 1881)
 Egira phahompoki Hreblay & Ronkay, 1999
 Egira purpurea (Barnes & McDunnough, 1910)
 Egira rubrica (Harvey, 1878)
 Egira saxea (Leech, 1889)
 Egira servadei Berio, 1982
 Egira simplex (Walker, 1865)
 Egira subterminata (Hampson, 1905)
 Egira tibori Hreblay, 1994
 Egira vanduzeei (Barnes & Benjamin, 1926)
 Egira variabilis (Smith, 1891)

References 

 Egira at Markku Savela's Lepidoptera and Some Other Life Forms
 Natural History Museum Lepidoptera genus database

Orthosiini